Palpita ocelliferalis is a moth in the family Crambidae. It was described by George Hampson in 1912. It is found in the Democratic Republic of the Congo (Equateur, West Kasai, Katanga, North Kivu, Orientale), Kenya, Nigeria and Uganda.

References

Moths described in 1912
Palpita
Moths of Africa